Christian Hubble is an American professional wrestler currently signed to All Elite Wrestling (AEW) and Ring of Honor (ROH) under the ring name Blake Christian. He is known for his tenure with WWE under the ring name Trey Baxter. He has also wrestled for New Japan Pro Wrestling, Impact Wrestling, Game Changer Wrestling, Warrior Wrestling and Ring of Honor.

Professional wrestling career

Independent circuit (2017-present) 
Christian began wrestling on the independent circuit in Tennessee in 2017. He spent three years with Game Changer Wrestling between 2019 and 2021.

On 19 October 2019, Christian debuted for Impact Wrestling at All Glory, defeating Alex Zayne and Mark Wheeler. On January 9, 2021, he made his pay-per-view debut at Genesis, competing in the 2021 Super X Cup. His final pay-per-view appearance was at No Surrender.

WWE (2021) 
On February 13, 2021, it was reported WWE had signed Christian to a developmental contract. On June 15, 2021, he debuted on the NXT brand under the ring name Trey Baxter, losing to Kushida for the NXT Cruiserweight Championship. He wrestled a number of matches on NXT and 205 Live, with his final being on 8 October, in a loss to Grayson Waller. He was released on 4 November.

All Elite Wrestling (2022-present) 
On the March 22, 2022 episode of AEW Dark, Christian made his All Elite Wrestling (AEW) debut defeating Rohit Raju. On the September 2 episode of AEW Rampage, Christian fought Rey Fenix in a losing effort.

Ring of Honor (2022-present) 
At Death Before Dishonor, Christian made his debut teaming with Alex Zayne and Tony Deppen in a losing effort to Brian Cage, Bishop Kaun, and Toa Liona of The Embassy. At Final Battle, he teamed with AR Fox defeating Rush and Dralístico. On February 25th, Christian faced Zack Sabre Jr for the NJPW World Television Championship, in a losing effort.

Championships and accomplishments 

 Fight Or Die Pro Wrestling
 Winner of the 2019 Young Guns Tournament

References

External links 

 
 
 

American male professional wrestlers
Living people
People from Missouri
Professional wrestlers from Missouri
1997 births
All Elite Wrestling personnel